The 1996–97 NBA season was the ninth season for the Miami Heat in the National Basketball Association. During the off-season, the Heat signed free agents, All-Star guard and three-point specialist Dan Majerle, P.J. Brown, and Isaac Austin. The team also signed All-Star forward Juwan Howard to a 7-year $100 million contract, but was voided by the league claiming that Miami exceeded their salary cap; Howard then quickly re-signed with the Washington Bullets. At midseason, the team traded second-year guard Sasha Danilovic, and second-year forward Kurt Thomas to the Dallas Mavericks in exchange for Jamal Mashburn.

After a 5–4 start to the season, the Heat went on a nine-game winning streak, then won eleven straight games between January and February, held a 36–12 record at the All-Star break, and won eight straight in March, as they won their first Division title with a record of 61 wins and 21 losses, which stood as the franchise mark until the 2012–13 season. The team also posted the league's best road record at 32–9, while posting a 29–12 record at home. Head coach Pat Riley was named Coach of the Year for the third time. The Heat had the best team defensive rating in the NBA.

Tim Hardaway had a career season with the Heat as he led the team with 20.3 points, 8.6 assists and 1.9 steals per game, while Alonzo Mourning averaged 19.8 points, 9.9 rebounds and 2.9 blocks per game. Hardaway and Mourning were both selected for the 1997 NBA All-Star Game, although Mourning did not play due to a foot injury, where he missed 16 games this season. Hardaway was named to the All-NBA First Team, and finished in fourth place in Most Valuable Player voting behind Karl Malone, Michael Jordan and Grant Hill. 

On the defensive side, Mourning and Brown both provided leadership, while on the offensive side, Mashburn gave the team a spark. In addition, second-year guard Voshon Lenard showed improvement becoming the team's starting shooting guard midway through the season, averaging 12.3 points per game, as Majerle only played just 36 games due to a back injury. Majerle contributed 10.8 points per game, while Brown provided the team with 9.5 points and 8.4 rebounds per game, and was named to the NBA All-Defensive Second Team. Off the bench, Austin, who played as backup center, averaged 9.7 points and 5.8 rebounds per game, and Keith Askins contributed 4.9 points and 3.5 rebounds per game. Austin was honored with the NBA Most Improved Player of the Year Award, while Lenard finished in fourth place in Most Improved Player voting.

In the Eastern Conference First Round of the playoffs, the Heat won their first ever playoff series by defeating their in-state rivals, the Orlando Magic in five games. In the Eastern Conference Semi-finals, they faced the New York Knicks, who took a 3–1 series lead over the Heat. Game 5 of that series featured a brawl, which involved Brown throwing Knicks guard Charlie Ward off the court, and with several Knicks players coming off the bench during the altercation, receiving automatic one-game suspensions while Brown was suspended for two games. The Heat managed to defeat the Knicks in seven games, but would lose in five games to the defending champion Chicago Bulls in the Eastern Conference Finals. The Bulls would go on to defeat the Utah Jazz in six games in the NBA Finals, winning their fifth championship in seven years.

Off-season

NBA draft

The Heat did not have any draft picks in 1996.

Roster

Regular season

Season standings

z – clinched division title
y – clinched division title
x – clinched playoff spot

Record vs. opponents

Schedule

Playoffs
In the first round of the playoffs, the Heat confronted their in-state rivals, the Orlando Magic. The Heat won the first two games. In Orlando, the Magic defeated the Heat to force a fifth game. The Heat won the decisive Game 5 at home, 91–83. Winning their first ever playoff series.
In the following round, the Heat were matched up against Pat Riley's former team, the New York Knicks. After the first four games, the Knicks had a 3–1 series lead. The Heat won Game 5 although the game was remembered for P. J. Brown fighting with Heisman Trophy winner Charlie Ward. Some Knicks players came off the bench and earned automatic suspensions, and Brown was suspended for the rest of the series. The Heat players stayed on the bench and gained an advantage for the rest of the series. The Heat eliminated the undermanned Knicks in seven games and one of the most heated rivalries in the NBA was born. In the Eastern Conference Finals, the Heat were defeated by the eventual NBA champion Chicago Bulls in five games.

|- align="center" bgcolor="#ccffcc"
| 1
| April 24
| Orlando
| W 99–64
| Voshon Lenard (24)
| P. J. Brown (12)
| Tim Hardaway (11)
| Miami Arena15,200
| 1–0
|- align="center" bgcolor="#ccffcc"
| 2
| April 27
| Orlando
| W 104–87
| Tim Hardaway (20)
| Alonzo Mourning (9)
| Tim Hardaway (11)
| Miami Arena15,200
| 2–0
|- align="center" bgcolor="#ffcccc"
| 3
| April 29
| @ Orlando
| L 75–88
| Alonzo Mourning (17)
| Alonzo Mourning (17)
| Tim Hardaway (8)
| Orlando Arena17,248
| 2–1
|- align="center" bgcolor="#ffcccc"
| 4
| May 1
| @ Orlando
| L 91–99
| Alonzo Mourning (23)
| Mourning, Brown (13)
| Tim Hardaway (8)
| Orlando Arena16,555
| 2–2
|- align="center" bgcolor="#ccffcc"
| 5
| May 4
| Orlando
| W 91–83
| Alonzo Mourning (22)
| P. J. Brown (14)
| Tim Hardaway (11)
| Miami Arena15,200
| 3–2
|-

|- align="center" bgcolor="#ffcccc"
| 1
| May 7
| New York
| L 79–88
| Tim Hardaway (21)
| P. J. Brown (12)
| Tim Hardaway (6)
| Miami Arena14,870
| 0–1
|- align="center" bgcolor="#ccffcc"
| 2
| May 9
| New York
| W 88–84
| Tim Hardaway (34)
| Alonzo Mourning (13)
| Hardaway, Majerle (4)
| Miami Arena14,870
| 1–1
|- align="center" bgcolor="#ffcccc"
| 3
| May 11
| @ New York
| L 73–77
| Voshon Lenard (22)
| P. J. Brown (10)
| Tim Hardaway (8)
| Madison Square Garden19,763
| 1–2
|- align="center" bgcolor="#ffcccc"
| 4
| May 12
| @ New York
| L 76–89
| Tim Hardaway (14)
| P. J. Brown (12)
| Willie Anderson (4)
| Madison Square Garden19,763
| 1–3
|- align="center" bgcolor="#ccffcc"
| 5
| May 14
| New York
| W 96–81
| Voshon Lenard (21)
| P. J. Brown (12)
| Tim Hardaway (6)
| Miami Arena14,782
| 2–3
|- align="center" bgcolor="#ccffcc"
| 6
| May 16
| @ New York
| W 95–90
| Alonzo Mourning (28)
| Alonzo Mourning (9)
| Tim Hardaway (8)
| Madison Square Garden19,763
| 3–3
|- align="center" bgcolor="#ccffcc"
| 7
| May 18
| New York
| W 101–90
| Tim Hardaway (38)
| Alonzo Mourning (12)
| Tim Hardaway (7)
| Miami Arena14,870
| 4–3
|-

|- align="center" bgcolor="#ffcccc"
| 1
| May 20
| @ Chicago
| L 77–84
| Alonzo Mourning (21)
| Mourning, Austin (8)
| Tim Hardaway (9)
| United Center24,544
| 0–1
|- align="center" bgcolor="#ffcccc"
| 2
| May 22
| @ Chicago
| L 68–75
| Tim Hardaway (15)
| Alonzo Mourning (8)
| Tim Hardaway (5)
| United Center24,544
| 0–2
|- align="center" bgcolor="#ffcccc"
| 3
| May 24
| Chicago
| L 74–98
| Voshon Lenard (14)
| Alonzo Mourning (9)
| John Crotty (5)
| Miami Arena14,720
| 0–3
|- align="center" bgcolor="#ccffcc"
| 4
| May 26
| Chicago
| W 87–80
| Tim Hardaway (25)
| Alonzo Mourning (14)
| Tim Hardaway (7)
| Miami Arena14,720
| 1–3
|- align="center" bgcolor="#ffcccc"
| 5
| May 28
| @ Chicago
| L 87–100
| Tim Hardaway (27)
| Alonzo Mourning (8)
| Lenard, Hardaway (5)
| United Center24,544
| 1–4
|-

Player statistics

NOTE: Please write the players statistics in alphabetical order by last name.

Season

Playoffs

Awards
 Tim Hardaway, All NBA First Team
 P. J. Brown, All NBA Defensive Second Team
 Pat Riley, Coach of the Year
 Isaac Austin, NBA Most Improved Player Award

Transactions

References

External links
 Heat on Database Basketball
 Heat on Basketball Reference

Miami
Miami Heat
Miami Heat